Phomopsis scabra is a fungal plant pathogen infecting plane trees.

External links
 USDA ARS Fungal Database

Fungal tree pathogens and diseases
scabra